New Norfolk is a town on the River Derwent, in the south-east of Tasmania, Australia. At the 2021 Census, New Norfolk had a population of 6,153.

Two examples of this heritage are Tasmania's oldest Anglican church, St. Matthews (built in 1823) and one of Australia's oldest hotels, The Bush Inn (Tasmania), trading continuously in the same building (built in 1815) since issue of the first licence on 29 September 1825. Many private homes from the 1800s to the early 1820s have also survived, such as Glen Derwent, Stanton, Valleyfield, and Woodbridge.

History

Resettlement of Norfolk Islanders

Approximately 163 of the pioneers who settled around the town were from the 554 folk resettled when the first Norfolk Island settlement was closed, most arriving during the period between 29 November 1807 and 2 October 1808. These Norfolk Islanders were mainly farming families, who were offered land grants in Tasmania as compensation for their relocation.

The climate was colder than sub-tropical Norfolk Island, which proved a challenge for the hardy pioneers during the first few years, but eventually the district became self-supporting. In 1825 the original name of the town, Elizabeth Town, was changed to New Norfolk in honour of their former home.

Many founding folk were "First Fleeters", transferred from Sydney to Norfolk Island when it was settled just a few weeks after Sydney. Ten First Fleeters are buried in the Methodist Chapel at Lawitta, New Norfolk.

Notable is Betty King, née Elizabeth Thackery, a first fleet convict girl who married at New Norfolk on 28 January 1810. The headstone on Betty's well-tended grave reads, "The first white woman to set foot in Australia" from the First Fleet at Sydney Cove. She is also believed to be the last surviving First Fleeter, male or female, when she died at 89 years of age on 7 August 1856.  Her husband was Marine Private Samuel King of the First Marine Regiment, another First Fleeter who arrived aboard the warship "Sirius".  Sam King was the last male "First Fleeter" to survive until 21 October 1849, aged 86 years.

Nine other First Fleeters were Ellen Guy (née Wainright), James Bryan Cullen, William Dempsey, William Edmunds, William Foyle, Abraham Hand, Stephen Martin, John Ruglass, and Edward Westlake.

The pioneers were successful farmers of the rich land around the town.  Initially cattle and sheep were predominant, with some cropping as land was cleared. Hop plants were introduced in 1846, and became an important crop. A number of hop drying kilns or oast houses remain in the area including those at Glen Derwent (built by Cullen) and Valleyfield.

Later history
The first road connecting the town to Hobart was built in 1818.

On 19 April 1827, Governor George Arthur issued an order to create the Willow Court infirmary, later known as Lachlan Park and most recently the Royal Derwent Hospital, as an asylum to accept sick and invalid convicts from Hobart, Launceston and outstations. Willow Court is now a large antiques centre.

The New Norfolk Post Office opened on 1 June 1832.

For some years after 1848, New Norfolk was the place of exile of the Irish nationalist leader Terence MacManus. His cottage "Kilburn Grange" still stands. Later he was joined by his fellow Irish rebel, William Smith O'Brien, who lived at Elwin's Hotel (now known as Glen Derwent).

In 1887, the railway, now preserved as the Derwent Valley Railway, was built. In 1888, Australia's first telephone trunk call was connected from Hobart to the Bush Inn Hotel in New Norfolk.

The 500-seat Plaza Theatre was constructed on a corner lot on High Street and opened its doors in 1932. Seating increased to 650 after renovations in 1940, however capacity was heavily reduced to 250 in 1971, with the venue utilising only the balcony seating. By March 1986, a new projection box was built and a side entrance was added to an auditorium wall, with the rear stalls and the previous foyer utilised for shopping. In 2016 the building is a Terry White Chemist.

During the 1940s, a newsprint mill was established at nearby Boyer, boosting industry in the local area.

Transport

New Norfolk is located on the Lyell Highway the main east-west highway in the southern half of the state, running from Hobart to Strahan on the west coast. It is in fact the only major east-west road in the southern half of Tasmania.

O’Driscoll Coaches Derwent Valley Link is a local family owned Bus company that Operates School Buses and General Access services between Hobart and the Derwent Valley and surrounding areas. MetroTas does not operate in New Norfolk.

A rail link was opened in 1887 but was closed in 1995 when floods and declining usage made repairs uneconomic. The line has been used for tourist trips by the Derwent Valley Railway but that has not been possible since 2005 due to lack of funding for track maintenance.

Tourism

New Norfolk is a central location for tourism in the upper Derwent Valley and near the tourist attractions of Mount Field, Lake Pedder, Strathgordon, Gordon Dam hydroelectric site, and the South West Wilderness.  The Tourist Information Centre staffed by volunteers is located in Circle Street next to the Council Chambers at the top end of High Street.

In 2021, New Norfolk had won the award for "Top Tourism town" by the Tourism Industry Council Tasmania (TICT).

In 2013 Martin Cash Pizza was voted best pizza maker in Tasmania.

Many of the historical farm house mansions, such as Glen Derwent and Tynwald, operate as bed and breakfast accommodation, tea rooms, restaurants and wedding venues.

The 1825 Heritage-listed Woodbridge on the Derwent, on the river next to the bridge, operates as a small luxury hotel, and is presently one of more than 10 5-star hotels in Tasmania, although the building is located only 6 metres from a major highway carrying log trucks 24 hours a day. It draws a clientele from all over the world.

It has a long and interesting history. Built by hand by convicts for Captain Roadknight, the first Constable of the then Elizabeth Town, it was later owned by William Sharland, assistant surveyor of Tasmania, and his descendants.
William Sharland constructed the wooden bridge across the Derwent next to Woodbridge - this was the first bridge across the Derwent, and the original Tollhouse still stands today.

By the 1950s, Woodbridge was derelict, and was converted into 7 flats. Again, by 2003, it was again derelict, and It was completely restored between 2003 and 2005. The restoration won the 2005 Tasmanian Restoration of the Year Award, and the 2006 Australian Restoration of the Year Award
The building is unique in that it was built in the prevailing simple Georgian style, but it has an octagonal three storey central tower, reminiscent of French chateau.

New Norfolk is colloquially known as “the antiques capital of Tasmania” home to many antique shops, including various shops in or off the town’s High Street and the large complex in the historical Willow Court precinct.

Climate
New Norfolk is the warmest area of Tasmania during summer afternoons and has a cool temperate oceanic climate that is classified as Cfb under Köppen Climate Classification.

See also
 New Norfolk High School
 Derwent Valley Council
 Norske Skog
 New Norfolk District Football Club
 Derwent Valley Railway (Tasmania)
 Royal Derwent Hospital
 Norfolk Island

References

Further reading
Fellowship of First Fleeters.
Cowburn, Joe; Cox, Rita (1986). New Norfolk's History and Achievements.

External links
New Norfolk, Tasmania - Capital of the Derwent Valley - Australia has extensive local information, history, photographs, resources and attractions

Localities of Derwent Valley Council
Towns in Tasmania
Southern Tasmania